Paul Day is a male former international table tennis player from England.

Table tennis career
He represented England at three World Table Tennis Championships in the Swaythling Cup (men's team event) from 1977-1981.

He won nine English National Table Tennis Championships titles.

Personal life
His parents Eric and Winnie hosted home premier division matches for the Soham team in their grounds.

See also
 List of England players at the World Team Table Tennis Championships

References

English male table tennis players
1958 births
Living people